Beuveille is a commune in the Meurthe-et-Moselle department in northeastern France.

History 

In the First World War during the Battle of Longwy (1914) Beuveille has been combat-standing of the German Crown Prince.

From 1915 to 1918 Beuveille became the headquarter of the Sturm-Bataillon Nr. 5 (Rohr).

Its artillery took place in Ugny, its hospital and the cemetery which includes their Monument in Pierrepont and the training ground and in the forest of Doncourt.

Population

See also
Communes of the Meurthe-et-Moselle department

References

Communes of Meurthe-et-Moselle